William Thomas Howe (18 June 1835 – April 1918) was a farmer and political figure in New Brunswick, Canada. He represented York County in the Legislative Assembly of New Brunswick from 1892 to 1899 as a Conservative member.

He was born in Fredericton, New Brunswick, the son of Thomas William Howe and Esther Emaa Sutherland. In 1862 he married Mary Ann Donald (1830–1917). Howe was a major in the local militia and was a member of the Fredericton City Council, also serving as county warden. He died and was buried in Stanley, New Brunswick.

References 

The Canadian parliamentary companion, 1897, JA Gemmill

1835 births
1918 deaths
Progressive Conservative Party of New Brunswick MLAs
Fredericton city councillors